The Danehill Stakes is a Victoria Racing Club Group 2 Thoroughbred horse race held at set weights conditions, with penalties, for horses aged three years old over a distance of 1100 metres. It is held annually at Flemington Racecourse, Melbourne, Australia in October. Total prizemoney for the race is A$300,000.

History
In 2006 the race was renamed in honour of Danehill, the leading sire of winners in Australia for nine consecutive seasons (1996–97 to 2004–05).
Prior to 2005 the event was scheduled on the first day of the VRC Spring Carnival - Victoria Derby Day.
The VRC moved the race to September. The race known as Ascot Vale Stakes was moved from September to Victoria Derby Day and classified as a Group 1 event.

Name
 1982–1986 - The Black Douglas
 1987–1993  - The Hilton On The Park Stakes
 1993 - Crown Casino Stakes 
 1994 - Victoria Racing Club Stakes
 1995–2000 - The Chivas Regal 
 2001–2005 - L'Oreal Plate
 2006 onwards - Danehill Stakes

Distance
 1982–1986  - 1100 metres
 1987–2020 - 1200 metres
 2021 onwards - 1100 metres

Grade
 1982–1984 - Listed Race
 1985–2008 - Group 3 race
 2009 onwards - Group 2 race

Winners

 2022 - Giga Kick
 2021 - Kallos
 2020 - Doubtland
 2019 - Dalasan
 2018 - Encryption
 2017 - Catchy
 2016 - Saracino
 2015 - Kinglike
 2014 - Rich Enuff
 2013 - Charlie Boy
 2012 - Snitzerland
 2011 - Sepoy
 2010 - Soul
 2009 - Black Caviar
 2008 - Aichi
 2007 - Tan Tat de Lago
 2006 - The One
 2005 - Jet Spur
 2004 - Fastnet Rock
 2003 - Abdullah
 2002 - Planchet
 2001 - Chong Tong
 2000 - St. Petersburg
 1999 - Falvelon
 1998 - Point Danger
 1997 - Dantelah
 1996 - Armidale
 1995 - Gold Ace
 1994 - I Love Sydney
 1993 - Dancing Dynamite
 1992 - Kenfair
 1991 - Umatilla
 1990 - Wrap Around
 1989 - Gin Rhythm
 1988 - Speeding Fine
 1987 - Grandiose
 1986 - Cavalry
 1985 - Rory's Jester
 1984 - High Signal
 1983 - Sculptor
 1982 - Fiesta Star

See also
 List of Australian Group races
 Group races

References

Horse races in Australia